"I Wanna Make You Close Your Eyes" is a song co-written and recorded by American country music artist Dierks Bentley. It was released in July 2009 as the third and final single from his 2009 album Feel That Fire. Bentley wrote the song with Brett Beavers.

Content
This song is a country ballad, in which the song's male narrator tells his lover that he "want[s] to make [her] close [her] eyes" (i.e., he wants to feel sexual arousal to the point that she closes her eyes to savor it).

Bentley said of the song, "One of the best compliments I can get is when a guy comes up to me and says that one of my songs helped him out at home...maybe helped him smooth something over with his girlfriend or wife.  That's the goal with this one."

Critical reception
Andrew Lacy of Engine 145 gave the song a "thumbs down" rating, criticizing it for "being boring and forgettable." He also went on to say that “[h]ere, [Bentley] sound[ed] as though co-producer Brett Beavers pulled him out of bed early in the morning, put a microphone in front of him, and told him to make it quick because Luke Bryan need[ed] to use the studio in 20 minutes."

Music video
The music video was directed by Chris Hicky and premiered in late 2009.

Chart performance
"I Wanna Make You Close Your Eyes" debuted at number 91 on the Billboard Hot 100 and peaked at number 52. On the week of January 26 2010, it peaked at number 2 on the country chart, making it the first single from this album to miss the top spot.

Year-end charts

Certifications

References

2009 singles
Country ballads
2000s ballads
Dierks Bentley songs
Songs written by Dierks Bentley
Songs written by Brett Beavers
Music videos directed by Chris Hicky
Capitol Records Nashville singles
Song recordings produced by Brett Beavers
2009 songs